1 Thessalonians 3 is the third chapter of the First Epistle to the Thessalonians in the New Testament of the Christian Bible. It is authored by Paul the Apostle, likely written in Corinth in about 50-51 CE for the church in Thessalonica. This chapter refers to Timothy's mission in Thessalonica, his report back to Paul, and Paul's prayer for the  Thessalonian church.

Text
The original text was written in Koine Greek. This chapter is divided into 13 verses.

Textual witnesses
Some early manuscripts containing the text of this chapter are:
Codex Vaticanus (AD 325–350)
Codex Sinaiticus (330–360)
Codex Alexandrinus (400–440)
Codex Freerianus (c. 450; extant verses 2–5, 11–13)
Codex Claromontanus (c. 550)

Timothy's mission (3:1–5)
Because Paul was no longer able to endure the separation from the Thessalonians, he resolved to stay behind alone in Athens and sent Timothy to Thessalonica. It is noted in Acts 17 that Paul went from Thessalonica to Athens, with "a brief intervening stay" in Berea.

Verses 1–3
 Therefore, when we could no longer endure it, we thought it good to be left in Athens alone, and sent Timothy, our brother and minister of God, and our fellow laborer in the gospel of Christ, to establish you and encourage you concerning your faith, that no one should be shaken by these afflictions; for you yourselves know that we are appointed to this.

"Timothy (NKJV; KJV: Timotheus), our brother": the brother in the ministry, in the same spiritual relation in Christ and of one heavenly Father.

 "minister of God" (lit. , diakonon tou theou): concerning the things and mysteries of God, the truths of his Gospel, according to the ability God gave him.

 "and our fellow laborer in the gospel of Christ": Timothy was given this characterization partly to introduce him as the messenger and partly so that the Thessalonians might receive him with the greater respect. The Vulgate (in Latin) and Ethiopian versions omit these words to read "a minister of God in the Gospel of Christ" in connection with the earlier phrase, whereas Beza's and the Alexandrian manuscripts read "in the doctrine of Christ".

 "to establish you and to encourage (NKJV; KJV: 'comfort') you concerning your faith": usually through the ministry of the word and the goal of the Gospel ministry, because the Thessalonians were still young converts, and just planted together as a church. Timothy is therefore sent to the true faith of Christ. The Vulgate renders the last part "to exhort you concerning your faith", to stand fast in it, in the exercise of the grace and doctrine of faith. The Syriac version reads, "to ask", means "to inquire" or be willing to know how it stood (cf. ).

Verse 5
For this reason, when I could no longer endure it, I sent [Timothy] to know your faith, lest by some means the tempter had tempted you, and our labor might be in vain.
In this verse, Paul states that "I could no longer endure it", whereas in verse 1 Paul's motivation is that "we could no longer endure it". Henry Alford suggests that this wording shows that Timothy himself was also anxious about the Thessalonians, not merely Paul's emissary.

Thankful receipt of Timothy's report (3:6–10)
Timothy returned to Paul bringing the good news of the faith (Greek: pistis) and love (Greek: agape) of the Thessalonians and their memory of Paul, as well as their longing to see him as much as he wants to see them.

Prayer for the Thessalonians (3:11–13)
Paul continues with a detailed text of prayer for the Thessalonians.

See also
 Athens
 Jesus Christ
 Timothy
 Related Bible parts: Matthew 24, Matthew 25, Acts 17, Philippians 1

References

Bibliography

External links
 King James Bible - Wikisource
English Translation with Parallel Latin Vulgate
Online Bible at GospelHall.org (ESV, KJV, Darby, American Standard Version, Bible in Basic English)
Multiple bible versions at Bible Gateway (NKJV, NIV, NRSV etc.)

03